

Ilya Muromets (Илья Муромец), named after the East Slavic folk hero, is a very steep vertical waterfall on the Bear's Peninsula of Iturup, one of the Kuril Islands. The water stream falls abruptly from the eastern slope of the Demon Volcano into the Pacific Ocean. With a height of 141 meters, it is one of the highest waterfalls in the Russian Far East. Ilya Muromets is rarely seen by tourists, however, because it can be accessed only by boat.

References 

Iturup
Waterfalls of Russia
Landforms of the Kuril Islands
Landforms of Sakhalin Oblast